This is a list of the National Register of Historic Places listings in Carroll County, New Hampshire.

This is intended to be a complete list of the properties and districts on the National Register of Historic Places in Carroll County, New Hampshire, United States. Latitude and longitude coordinates are provided for many National Register properties and districts; these locations may be seen together in a map.

There are 59 properties and districts listed on the National Register in the county, including 1 National Historic Landmark.

Current listings

|}

See also

 List of National Historic Landmarks in New Hampshire
 National Register of Historic Places listings in New Hampshire

Notes

References

Carroll